The rainstorm warning signals are a set of signals used in Hong Kong to alert the public about the occurrence of heavy rain which is likely to bring about major disruptions such as traffic congestion and floods. They also ensure a state of readiness within the essential services to deal with emergencies.

Hong Kong Observatory is responsible for launching these signals and the signals are broadcast over radio and television.

The three-level system

The RED and BLACK signals warn the public of heavy rain which is likely to bring about serious road flooding and traffic congestion. They will trigger response actions by Government departments and major transport and utility operators. The public will be given clear advice on the appropriate actions to take.

History
Heavy rain warning was first introduced in April 1967 together with thunderstorm warning by the Royal Observatory of Hong Kong as a result of the three rainstorms in 1966 which claimed 86 lives. The heavy rain warning was issued when an hourly rainfall of more than 50 mm (2 inches before metrication) was expected in six hours. Both heavy rain and thunderstorm warnings were issued to the public through press release, radio broadcast and telephone calling service to subscribers. In 1983, the heavy rain warning was replaced by flood and landslip warnings.

On 8 May 1992, the Royal Observatory of Hong Kong recorded 109.9 mm rainfall from 6 o'clock to 7 o'clock in the morning, breaking the hourly rainfall record on 12 June 1966. The torrential rain caused over 200 cases of flooding and many landslips. Road traffic was paralysed. Some roads in Admiralty were turned into rapids washing several people away. However, the Education Department did not announce school closure until 11 am, so many students braved the elements to go to schools, but some of them only found on arrival that their schools were closed, and parents were confused and worried for the safety of their children. Five people, including two children, were killed by landslides, lightning and rapid flooding. Because of this rainstorm, the Observatory proposed Hong Kong rainstorm warning signals which included three colours, amber, red and black. The amber signal were the first stage of the warning system based on forecast of heavy rainstorms, and were used to alert government departments and major public transport and utility services. The red and black signals were the second stage of the warning system based on actual rainfall levels recorded, and were issued to the public.
 Amber: More than 50 mm of rain is expected in the Hong Kong region within six hours.
 Red: Rainstorm has started and more than 50 mm of rain has been recorded over a wide area within the last hour or less.
 Black: More than 100 mm of rain has been recorded within the past two hours or less.

On 4 June 1997, the red signal was issued at 7.05 am, but the Education Department only decided to close afternoon schools at 10.30 am, saying that it did not close morning schools in spite of the red signal because many students were heading to schools at that time. Following criticisms by the Ombudsman, the Hong Kong Observatory revised the rainstorm warning system to the current one in 1998, and the Education Department also revised the school closure system for rainstorm. The current rainstorm warning system consists of three signals based on both predicted and recorded rainfall levels, and all three signals are issued to the public.

See also
 Hong Kong Observatory
 Hong Kong tropical cyclone warning signals

References

External links
Rainstorm Warning Signals
Actions to be taken for rainstorm signals

1993 establishments in Hong Kong
Weather warnings and advisories
Climate of Hong Kong
Emergency management in Hong Kong